Was bleibt may refer to:

 What Remains, a 1990 novella by East German author Christa Wolf
 Home for the Weekend, a 2012 German film directed by Hans-Christian Schmid